Bracey is an English surname.  Notable people with the surname include:

Andrew Bracey (born 1978), British artist
Bonnie Bracey, American teacher
Bryan Bracey (born 1978), American retired basketball player
Christopher Bracey (born 1970), American lawyer and professor
Claude Bracey (1909–1940), American sprinter
Frederick Bracey (1887–1960), English cricketer
Gerald Bracey (1940–2009), American education policy researcher
Ishmon Bracey (1901–1970), American blues musician
Keith Bracey (1915/1916–2010), New Zealand television presenter
Ken Bracey (born 1937), American minor league baseball player and manager
Kim Bracey, American politician
Lee Bracey (born 1968), English footballer
Luke Bracey (born 1989), Australian actor
Shermar Bracey (born 1982), American player of Canadian football
Sidney Bracey (1877–1942), Australian-born American actor
Steve Bracey (1950–2006), American basketball player

With the given name:

 Bracey Wright, NBA player, guard for the Minnesota Timberwolves, 2015 Israeli Basketball Premier League MVP

English-language surnames